Canaxis 5 (or simply Canaxis) is the only studio album by the Technical Space Composer's Crew, released in 1969 by Music Factory. On later issues, the artist credit was changed to Holger Czukay and Rolf Dammers. The album was remixed for Spoon Records releases and again for the Revisited Rec. release.

Track listing
Both pieces composed by Holger Czukay.

Personnel
Adapted from Canaxis 5 liner notes.
Technical Space Composer's Crew
 Holger Czukay – tape, production, engineering
 Rolf Dammers – co-producer

Release history

References

External links 
 

1969 debut albums
Holger Czukay albums
Instrumental albums